Yinzhong Lu Station is a station of Line 2, Suzhou Rail Transit located in Wuzhong District of Suzhou. It started operation in September 24, 2016, with the opening of the Baodaiqiao South - Sangtiandao extension on Line 2.

References 

Railway stations in Jiangsu
Suzhou Rail Transit stations
Railway stations in China opened in 2016